The list of seven provinces of Nepal by population (2021 census).

See also 
List of Nepalese provinces by GDP
List of Nepalese provinces by HDI
 Administrative divisions of Nepal

References

 Population
Ranked lists of country subdivisions
Population,provinces
Population